The regions of Guyana are divided into three types of councils: municipal or town councils, neighbourhood democratic councils and Amerindian villages.

The ten towns of Guyana are:

 Anna Regina
 Bartica
 Corriverton
 Georgetown
 Lethem
 Linden
 Mabaruma
 Mahdia
 New Amsterdam
 Rose Hall

The neighbourhood democratic councils are listed below by region:

Barima-Waini (Region 1)
 Ridge/Arakaka
 Mabaruma/Kumaka/Hosororo

Pomeroon-Supenaam (Region 2)
 Charity/Urasara
 Evergreen/Paradise
 Aberdeen/Zorg-en-Vlygt
 Annandale/Riverstown
 Good Hope/Pomona

Essequibo Islands-West Demerara (Region 3)

 Wakenaam
 Leguan
 Mora/Parika
 Hydronie/Good Hope
 Greenwich Park, Vergenoegen
 Tuschen/Uitvlugt
 Stewartville/Cornelia Ida
 Hague/Blankenburg
 La Jalousie/Nouvelle Flanders
 Best/Klien/Pouderoyen
 Malgre Tout/Meer Zorgen
 La Grange/Nimes
 Canal's Polder
 Toevlugt/Patentia

Demerara-Mahaica (Region 4)

 Soesdyke/Huis't Coverden NDC
 Caledonia/Good Success
 Little Diamond/Herstelling
 Golden Grove/Diamond Place
 Mocha/Arcadia
 Ramsburg/Eccles
 Industry/Plaisance
 Better Hope/LBI
 Beterverwagting/Triumph
 Mon Repos/La Reconnaissance
 Buxton/Foulis
 Enmore/Hope
 Haslington/Grove
 Unity/Vereeniging
 Cane Grove

Mahaica-Berbice (Region 5)

 Woodlands/Farm
 Hamlet/Chance
 Mahaicony/Abary
 Profit/Rising Sun
 Seafield/Tempie
 Union/Naarstigheid
 Bath/Woodley Park
 Woodlands/Bel Air
 Zeelugt/Rosignol
 Blairmont/Gelderland

East Berbice-Corentyne (Region 6)

 Enfield/New Doe Park
 Ordinance/FortLands
 Canefield/Enterprise
 Kintyre/No.37
 Gibraltar/Fyrish
 Kilcoy/Hampshire
 Port Mourant/John
 Bloomfield/Whim
 Lancaster/Hogstye
 Black Bush Polder
 Good Hope/No.51
 Macedonia/Joppa
 Bushlot/Adventure
 Maida/Tarlogie
 No. 52/ No. 74
 Crabwood Creek/Molsen Creek

Cuyuni-Mazaruni (Region 7)
 Bartica NDC

Potaro-Siparuni (Region 8)
No subdivisions. Governed from the regional capital Mahdia

Upper Takutu-Upper Essequibo (Region 9)
 Ireng/Sawariwau NDC Dissolved in 2012.

Upper Demerara-Berbice (Region 10)
 Kwakwani NDC

See also
 Indigenous villages in Guyana
 Regions of Guyana

References

 Guyanese Government Statistics

 
Subdivisions of Guyana
Guyana, Neighbourhood Councils
Neighbourhood Councils, Guyana
Guyana geography-related lists
Politics of Guyana
Political organisations based in Guyana
Guyana politics-related lists